Indri may refer to:

Archeoindris, an extinct genus of large lemur.
Indri, a lemur of Madagascar
Indri people
Indri, India, a city in the Karnal district in the Indian state of Haryana.
Indri Search Engine in Lemur Project 
 A singular sense organs or faculty, collectively known as Indriya.